Aleksander Bardini (17 November 1913 – 30 July 1995) was a Polish theatre and opera director, actor, notable professor at the State Theatre School in Warsaw. He appeared in 30 films between 1937 and 1994.

Selected filmography
 Long Is the Road (1948)
 Landscape After the Battle (1970)
 Spiral (1978)
 No End (1985)
 The Last Manuscript (1987)
 Dekalog (1988)
 Korczak (1990)
 The Double Life of Véronique (1991)
 Prince of Shadows (1991)
 Three Colours: White (1994)

References

External links

1913 births
1995 deaths
Burials at Powązki Cemetery
Polish male film actors
20th-century Polish Jews
Actors from Łódź
20th-century Polish male actors